Taliaferro County is a county located in the U.S. state of Georgia.  As of the 2020 census, the population was 1,559, down from the 2010 census when the population was 1,717, making it the least populous county in Georgia and the second-least populous county east of the Mississippi River (after Issaquena County, Mississippi). The county seat is Crawfordville.

History
Taliaferro County was formed by an act of the Georgia Legislature meeting in Milledgeville on December 24, 1825. It was formed by taking portions of five other counties: Wilkes, Greene, Hancock, Oglethorpe, and Warren Counties.

The county was named for Colonel Benjamin Taliaferro of Virginia, who was an officer in the American Revolution.

The county is most famous for containing the birthplace and home of Alexander H. Stephens, who served as a U.S. congressman from Georgia in the antebellum South, as vice president of the Confederate States of America during the Civil War, and as governor of Georgia after the war (dying in office). A state park near his home in Crawfordville bears his name.

Geography
It is drained by tributaries of the Ogeechee and Little rivers.

The northern half of Taliaferro County, north of Crawfordville, is located in the Little River sub-basin of the Savannah River basin.  The southern half of the county is located in the Upper Ogeechee River sub-basin of the Ogeechee River basin.

Major highways
  Interstate 20
  U.S. Route 278
  State Route 12
  State Route 22
  State Route 44
  State Route 47
  State Route 402 (unsigned designation for I-20)

Adjacent counties
 Wilkes County - north
 Oglethorpe County - north
 Warren County - southeast
 Hancock County - south
 Greene County - west

Demographics

2020 census

As of the 2020 United States Census, there were 1,559 people, 593 households, and 399 families residing in the county.

2010 census
As of the 2010 United States Census, there were 1,717 people, 759 households, and 480 families living in the county. The racial makeup of the county was 59.6% black or African American, 37.3% white, 0.6% Asian, 0.1% American Indian, 0.9% from other races, and 1.4% from two or more races. Those of Hispanic or Latino origin made up 2.0% of the population.

Of the 759 households, 24.9% had children under the age of 18 living with them, 35.6% were married couples living together, 22.0% had a female householder with no husband present, 36.8% were non-families, and 33.2% of all households were made up of individuals. The average household size was 2.25 and the average family size was 2.83. The median age was 45.9 years.

The median income for a household in the county was $22,188 and the median income for a family was $29,375. Males had a median income of $29,435 versus $20,227 for females. The per capita income for the county was $13,955. About 30.1% of families and 34.4% of the population were below the poverty line, including 60.6% of those under age 18 and 24.9% of those age 65 or over.

2000 census
As of the census of 2000, there were 2,077 people, 870 households, and 559 families living in the county.  The population density was 11 people per square mile (4/km2).  There were 1,085 housing units at an average density of 6 per square mile (2/km2).  The racial makeup of the county was 60.33% Black or African American, 38.18% White,  0.05% Native American, 0.05% Asian, 0.67% from other races, and 0.72% from two or more races.  0.91% of the population were Hispanic or Latino of any race.

There were 870 households, out of which 26.80% had children under the age of 18 living with them, 39.30% were married couples living together, 20.00% had a female householder with no husband present, and 35.70% were non-families. 33.30% of all households were made up of individuals, and 16.80% had someone living alone who was 65 years of age or older.  The average household size was 2.36 and the average family size was 3.00.

In the county, the population was spread out, with 24.10% under the age of 18, 7.60% from 18 to 24, 24.60% from 25 to 44, 24.80% from 45 to 64, and 18.90% who were 65 years of age or older.  The median age was 40 years. For every 100 females there were 93.20 males.  For every 100 females age 18 and over, there were 87.30 males.

The median income for a household in the county was $23,750, and the median income for a family was $27,800. Males had a median income of $26,380 versus $21,534 for females. The per capita income for the county was $15,498.  About 22.30% of families and 23.40% of the population were below the poverty line, including 30.30% of those under age 18 and 23.40% of those age 65 or over.

Communities
 Crawfordville (county seat)
 Sharon

Economy
Taliaferro county's main employer is the government, primarily the Taliaferro County Sheriffs Department, which patrols I-20 and issues many traffic tickets per capita compared to other counties in the state. For instance, Fulton County, the largest county by population in Georgia, gains $16.98 per capita in traffic ticket revenue. By comparison, Taliaferro county gains $1,614.33 per capita, which is around a hundred times more.

Notable people 
 Romulus Moore
 Maude Andrews Ohl (1862–1943), journalist, poet, novelist
 Alexander H. Stephens

In popular culture
Several Hollywood films have been shot in Taliaferro County. Paris Trout (1991), starring Dennis Hopper and based on the novel by the same name by Pete Dexter, was primarily filmed in the county. Sweet Home Alabama (2002), starring Reese Witherspoon, was filmed in the county seat of Crawfordville.

Politics

See also

 Central Savannah River Area
 National Register of Historic Places listings in Taliaferro County, Georgia
List of counties in Georgia

References

External links
 Official website
 Georgia Historical Markers in Taliaferro County

 
Georgia (U.S. state) counties
1825 establishments in Georgia (U.S. state)
Populated places established in 1825
Black Belt (U.S. region)
Majority-minority counties in Georgia